Mastery Charter School Shoemaker Campus, formerly William Shoemaker Junior High School, is a historic high school/middle school located in the Carroll Park neighborhood of Philadelphia, Pennsylvania. It is currently a charter school run by Mastery Charter Schools.

The building was designed by Irwin T. Catharine and built in 1925. It is a four-story, 14 bay, reinforced concrete, yellow brick faced building in the Late Gothic Revival-style. It features a central projecting entrance bay with Gothic arched door, thin brick piers with decorative caps, and brick panels in a herringbone pattern. The building was added to the National Register of Historic Places in 1986.

References

External links

School buildings on the National Register of Historic Places in Philadelphia
Gothic Revival architecture in Pennsylvania
School buildings completed in 1925
Charter schools in Pennsylvania
West Philadelphia
Public middle schools in Pennsylvania
Public elementary schools in Pennsylvania
1925 establishments in Pennsylvania